Han Invasion may refer to:

Zhuge Liang's Northern Expeditions (228-234)
Jiang Wei's Northern Expeditions (247-262)